Capital punishment is a legal penalty in the East African nation of Somalia. Most of executions in Somalia are through shooting, but Sharia courts also use beheading and stoning. In 2011 three soldiers were executed for murder by the Transitional Federal Government. Another soldier was executed a few years later. The activist NGO Human Rights Watch noted in 2014 that summary executions were on the rise in the nation. At least 14 executions were carried out in 2016, and the rate of executions rose in 2017, which human rights groups mainly attributed to military courts and the militant jihadist group Al-Shabaab. The European Union requested that Somalia enact a moratorium on the death penalty as a result. Most executions by firing squad occur publicly and persons sentenced to death are usually executed by firing squad.

See also
Law of Somalia

External links

References

Somalia
Murder in Somalia
Law of Somalia
Human rights abuses in Somalia